"I'll Take Her" is the second single released from Ill Al Skratch's debut album, Creep wit' Me. The song featured vocals from R&B singer Brian McKnight. The song samples "You're so good to me" by Curtis Mayfield, which was also sampled on "Be Happy" by Mary J. Blige the same year. A sample of Vocals from "Jane" by EPMD was also used.

Released late in 1994, "I'll Take Her" became a moderate crossover hit, peaking at number 62 on the Billboard Hot 100 while also becoming a bigger hit on both the R&B and rap charts, peaking at number 16 and number five respectively.

Single track listing

A-Side
"I'll Take Her" (Radio Version) – 4:05
"I'll Take Her" (Extended Version) – 4:53
" I'll Take Her" (Brian's Flow) – 4:26

B-Side
"Brooklyn Uptown Connection" (Club Version) – 4:20
"Brooklyn Uptown Connection" (Instrumental) – 4:17
"Brooklyn Uptown Connection" (Acapella) – 4:20

Chart history

1994 singles
1994 songs
Mercury Records singles